Clark S. Gruening (born March 28, 1943) is an attorney and Democratic Party politician from the U.S. state of Alaska.  He is chiefly known as the second of three persons to defeat the incumbent holder of Alaska's Class 3 United States Senate seat in the primary election.

Clark Gruening was born in San Francisco, California, the son of Huntington Sanders "Hunt" Gruening, the second-born and (after 1955) only surviving son of Ernest Gruening, who at the time of Clark's birth was governor of the Territory of Alaska.  He grew up in Juneau, Alaska, where his father was an airline pilot and executive. Clark graduated from Juneau-Douglas High School in 1961. He received a B.A. in political science from the University of Oregon in 1965 and a J.D. from George Washington University in 1969.  He moved to Anchorage that same year.

Gruening, an attorney outside politics, was elected to two terms in the Alaska House of Representatives starting in 1974. In the 1980 U.S. Senate election in Alaska, he ran in the Democratic primary, defeating incumbent Senator Mike Gravel. In 1968, Gravel had himself defeated Clark's grandfather, Ernest Gruening, in the Democratic primary.

Both election results were attributed to Alaska's blanket primary system, which was brand new in 1968 and eventually discontinued due to complaints by individual political parties that members of other parties had a hand in the selection of their party's nominees. Specifically, it was felt that Republicans and supporters of Frank Murkowski voted in large numbers for Gruening in hopes of eliminating Gravel. Extremely unpopular with Alaskan voters at the time, Gravel nonetheless was felt to pose a more serious challenge to Murkowski, largely on account of his incumbency.

Gruening went on to lose the 1980 general election to Murkowski.

References

External links
 Clark Gruening at 100 Years of Alaska's Legislature

1943 births
Alaska lawyers
American people of German-Jewish descent
George Washington University Law School alumni
Living people
Democratic Party members of the Alaska House of Representatives
Politicians from Anchorage, Alaska
Politicians from Juneau, Alaska
Lawyers from Anchorage, Alaska
Lawyers from San Francisco
University of Oregon alumni